Something for Everyone is a 1970 American black comedy film starring Angela Lansbury, Michael York, Anthony Higgins, and Jane Carr.

The film was based on the novel The Cook by Harry Kressing, with a screenplay by Hugh Wheeler. The plot to the film is quite different from the novel. Directed by Harold Prince (in his feature directorial debut) for Cinema Center Films, the film began shooting on 30 June 1969 and was originally released by National General Pictures in July 1970. Lansbury was nominated for the Golden Globe Award for Best Actress – Motion Picture Musical or Comedy.

In the UK, the film was retitled Black Flowers for the Bride (subtitle: A Comedy of Evil) and released in May 1971. In 1986 and 1990, a VHS of the film was issued followed by DVD and Blu-ray on 6 December 2016.

Plot
A handsome young stranger, Konrad Ludwig, is fascinated by a castle near the Bavarian village of Ornstein. He dreams of owning and living in the castle, which is the property of widowed countess Herthe von Ornstein, who lives in the dower house, unable financially to open and live in her castle.

As Konrad schemes to become one of the countess's servants, he romances a beautiful and wealthy young lady, Anneliese Pleschke, daughter of a nouveau riche couple. The idea is to use their wealth to reopen castle Ornstein. After an afternoon of chauffeuring the Pleschkes around the countryside, he gets Rudolph, the countess's footman, drunk at the local Biergarten and then run over by a train. Konrad then takes Rudolph's place in the countess's household.

Helmuth von Ornstein, a shy and attractive young man, and Lotte von Ornstein, a plain and annoying girl, are the countess's children. Helmuth is gay and begins to be romanced by Konrad when the stern majordomo, Klaus, tries to put a stop to it by firing Konrad. When the mayor of Ornstein is militantly disposed to root out all Nazis remaining in Germany, Konrad reports Klaus to the mayor after discovering he is harboring a scandalous secret: his father was a Nazi colonel, whose memory is fondly enshrined in Klaus's bedroom. Klaus is summarily and quietly put out of the countess's employ, leaving Konrad free to be Helmuth's lover while taking Klaus's place as majordomo.

Konrad now plays up to the countess, encouraging her to throw a daring, expensive party at the dower house in order to initiate a pseudo romance between Helmuth and Anneliese Pleschke. Konrad, the lover of both Helmuth and Anneliese, induces them to become engaged to each other, while secretly assuring both of them that he would always be there at the castle. When the marriage contract is signed, the Pleschke money flows in to reopen and refurbish the castle Ornstein.

The marriage takes place, but the honeymoon is a disaster with both the bride and groom wanting an annulment. The demise of the grand design is hastened along by Anneliese, who walks in on Konrad and Helmuth kissing. Anneliese, shocked and speechless, is ushered to the limousine in which she and her parents are to be driven to the castle by Konrad. When Anneliese hysterically opens up to her parents, Konrad turns the limousine down a steep embankment, managing to jump out before it crashes, killing Anneliese and her parents. Konrad escapes with a broken leg.

Konrad goes through a pleasant convalescence with the countess herself becoming his new romantic interest. After an amorous night in the countess's boudoir, they plan to be married. Helmuth is devastated. He reluctantly allows the marriage to go on rather than have Konrad be forced to leave by a scorned countess.

Helmuth's sister Lotte has other plans. On the eve of the wedding she informs Konrad that she knows all about his murderous and scandalous exploits. Ingeniously she avoids being Konrad's next victim and has him marry her instead of her mother.

Cast
 Angela Lansbury as countess Herthe von Ornstein
 Michael York as Konrad Ludwig
 Anthony Higgins as Helmuth von Ornstein (billed as Anthony Corlan)
 Jane Carr as Lotte von Ornstein
 Heidelinde Weis as Anneliese Pleschke
 Wolfried Lier as Klaus
 Despo Diamantidou as Bobby (billed as Despo)
 John Gill as Herr Pleschke
 Eva Maria Meineke as Frau Pleschke
 Klaus Havenstein as Rudolph
 Walter Janssen as Father Georg

Reception
In a contemporary review, critic Charles Champlin of the Los Angeles Times called the film an "essentially empty charade" and wrote: "In a diversion like this it is necessary—if only to engage the viewer's sympathies—to align your evil demon against some person or persons who are at least relatively good. But there's not really anyone to root for in 'Something for Everyone.' Miss Lansbury is rather more innocently corrupt than York, but it's also obvious that she can outwit him any minute she puts her mind to it." Regarding first-time director Harold Prince, Champlin surmised: "Prince set himself an initial assignment which was probably even more imposing than it seemed to be ... But he never defines a unifying intention for the movie—social satire, tense psychological thriller or suspense drama with comedic overtones."

Critic John Simon called Something for Everyone "a thoroughly unsavory film", and left no stone unturned in a particularly acidic, and perhaps self-revealing, diatribe accusing it of immorality and glorification of homosexuality: "I submit that the entire film exemplifies a kind of vengeance on the heterosexual world by a mentality resenting its real or alleged compulsion to disassemble and hide its predilections. In retaliation, anything that the so-called normal world considers healthy and decent—and some of it, so help us, is healthy and decent—is systematically trodden underheel."

On it's British release as Black Flowers for the Bride, film critic Margaret Hinxman, writing in the Sunday Telegraph, called it “a dazzling compendium of skulduggery” and "“a wickedly funny film, richly inventive in selecting the targets (including lingering Nazi fervour) for its humour.”

See also
 List of American films of 1970

References

External links
 
Vincent Canby review, The New York Times (July 23, 1970)

1970 films
1970s black comedy films
American black comedy films
American LGBT-related films
Films based on American novels
1970 LGBT-related films
LGBT-related black comedy films
Films set in Austria
Cinema Center Films films
Films directed by Harold Prince
1970 directorial debut films
1970 comedy films
1970 drama films
1970s English-language films
1970s American films